Shi Liang (1900–1985) was one of the "Seven Gentlemen" and the first Minister of Justice of the PRC.

Shi Liang may also refer to:

 Shi Liang (Ming dynasty), general of Ming Emperor Zhu Yuanzhang
 Shi Liang (footballer), Chinese footballer

See also
Shi Lang